Charles Dickson (7 July 1934 – 18 October 2013) was a Scottish footballer best known for playing for Dunfermline Athletic. He scored 215 goals in 340 appearances for the club which remains an all-time club record.

Dickson also played for Penicuik Athletic and Queen of the South.

References

1934 births
2013 deaths
Association football forwards
Dunfermline Athletic F.C. players
Expatriate soccer players in Australia
Penicuik Athletic F.C. players
Queen of the South F.C. players
Scottish expatriate footballers
Scottish expatriate sportspeople in Australia
Scottish Football League players
Scottish footballers
Footballers from Edinburgh